Tracey Trench is an American film producer. A Harvard University and UCLA graduate, she has worked for the Hong Kong Trade Development Council, Creative Artists Agency, and Oriental Dreamworks.

Filmography
 Fear and Learning at Hoover Elementary, (1997)
 Ever After, (1998)
 I'll Be Home for Christmas, (1998)
 Head over Heels, (2001)
 See Spot Run, (2001)
 Corky Romano, (2001)
 Frank McKlusky, C.I., (2002)
 Just Married, (2003)
 Chasing Papi, (2003)
 Herbie: Fully Loaded, (2005)
 Rebound, (2005)
 Yours, Mine & Ours, (2005)
 The Pink Panther, (2006)
 The Headhuntress, (2011)
 Crashing Star, (upcoming)

References

American film producers
Harvard University alumni
University of California, Los Angeles alumni
Year of birth missing (living people)
Living people